Ralph William Howard (17 May 1931 – 19 December 2013) was an Australian politician.

He was born in Melbourne to carpenter William Howard and Hazel Ralph. He was educated at Balwyn and Box Hill before attending Scotch College and then Melbourne University, where he received a Master of Business and a Bachelor of Science. He was a doctor at Footscray Hospital from 1957 to 1958 and at Prince Henry's Hospital from 1958 to 1959, thereafter becoming surgical register in 1959 and dermatologist in 1961. On 21 July 1961 he married Judith Elinor May Vertigan, with whom he had two sons. From 1962 to 1964 he was senior medical officer with the Royal Australian Air Force in Tottenham, and from 1964 to 1965 was assistant general secretary of the Australian Medical Association. From 1965 to 1976 he was medical director for a number of companies. In 1976 he was elected to the Victorian Legislative Council for Templestowe Province representing the Liberal Party. He ran unsuccessfully for preselection for the lower house seat of Kew in 1981, and was defeated in Templestowe in 1982. He subsequently returned to business, in partnership with fellow defeated politician Graeme Weideman. Howard died in 2013.

References

1931 births
2013 deaths
Liberal Party of Australia members of the Parliament of Victoria
Members of the Victorian Legislative Council
Australian dermatologists
Politicians from Melbourne
Medical doctors from Melbourne
People educated at Scotch College, Melbourne
Royal Australian Air Force personnel